Rebecca Suzanne Roeber (May 25, 1958 – July 30, 2019) was an American politician. Roeber was born in Kansas City, Kansas. She received her bachelor's degree in education in 1996 from Avila University. Roeber taught in the Raytown School District. She was a member of the Missouri House of Representatives, having served since 2015. She was a member of the Republican Party. Roeber was involved in a serious automobile accident in Syracuse, Missouri, in March 2019. She died on July 30, 2019, while vacationing in Estes Park, Colorado.

References

1958 births
2019 deaths
Politicians from Kansas City, Missouri
Avila University alumni
Educators from Missouri
American women educators
Women state legislators in Missouri
Republican Party members of the Missouri House of Representatives
Road incident deaths in Colorado
21st-century American politicians
21st-century American women politicians